Moles can refer to:

Moles de Xert, a mountain range in the Baix Maestrat comarca, Valencian Community, Spain
The Moles (Australian band)
The Moles, alter ego of Scottish band Simon Dupree and the Big Sound

People
Abraham Moles, French engineer
Andy Moles, English cricketer 
Brodie Moles, Australian football player
Enrique Moles Ormella, Spanish chemist
Giuseppe Moles (born 1967), Italian politician
James Moles, English football player 
John Moles (1949–2015), British historian
Osvaldo Moles, Brazilian journalist
Thomas Moles, Ulster Unionist politician

See also
 Mole (disambiguation)
 Molas (disambiguation)